The John Steiner Store is located in Alma, Wisconsin. It was listed on the National Register of Historic Places in 1982 and on the State Register of Historic Places in 1989.

References

Commercial buildings on the National Register of Historic Places in Wisconsin
Department stores on the National Register of Historic Places
National Register of Historic Places in Buffalo County, Wisconsin
Defunct department stores based in Wisconsin
Brick buildings and structures
Commercial buildings completed in 1883